Szymon Krzeszowiec (born 20 April 1974) is a Polish violinist, chamber musician and pedagogue. Musician of the Silesian String Quartet and member of the Trio Aristos.

Education 

Szymon Krzeszowiec was born in Tychy, Poland.  He started his musical education in the Complex of State Music Schools in Katowice, with Urszula Szygulska. Later, he went to the Karol Szymanowski Secondary Musical School in Katowice and studied there with prof. Paweł Puczek. As a pupil of this school, he won first prizes on all-Poland competitions and auditions. He took part in summer music academies in Łańcut and Żagań.

Between 1993 and 1997, he studied in the violin class of prof. Roman Lasocki in the Karol Szymanowski Academy of Music in Katowice (diploma with distinction). Later, he studied at the Conservatorium van Amsterdam with prof. Herman Krebbers. He participated in masterclasses with such artists as, among others: Glenn Dicterow, Dmitri Ferschtman, Paweł Głombik, Yair Kless, Krzysztof Węgrzyn and Tadeusz Wroński.

Competitions 

Szymon Krzeszowiec is a laureate of violin competitions in Poznań (Ogólnopolski Konkurs Skrzypcowy im. Z. Jahnkego), Warsaw (Konkurs na Skrzypce Solo im. T. Wrońskiego) and Brescia (Italy), of chamber music competition in Łódź (Konkurs Muzyki Kameralnej im. Kiejstuta Bacewicza).

Artistic activity 

Most recently, the artistic activity of Szymon Krzeszowiec is dominated by chamber performances, but his solo career still develops.

Soloist 

As a soloist, he performed with such orchestras as : National Polish Radio Symphony Orchestra, Sinfonia Varsovia, Silesian Philharmonic (Symphony Orchestra), AUKSO Chamber Orchestra  and many others. He played under the baton of conductors: Mirosław Jacek Błaszczyk, Jacek Boniecki, Leo Brouwer, Tomasz Bugaj, Szymon Bywalec, Sławomir Chrzanowski, Michał Dworzyński, Czesław Grabowski, Jan Wincenty Hawel, Michał Klauza, Jerzy Kosek, Marek Moś, Michał Nesterowicz, Grzegorz Nowak, Charles Olivieri-Munroe, Janusz Powolny, Ahmed el Saedi, Jerzy Salwarowski, Robert Satanowski, Tadeusz Strugała, Jerzy Swoboda, Tomasz Tokarczyk, Tadeusz Wicherek, Piotr Wijatkowski, Tadeusz Wojciechowski, Christoph Wyneken and Jan Miłosz Zarzycki.

Cooperation with pianists 

For many years, Szymon Krzeszowiec has played with eminent pianists : Maria Szwajger-Kułakowska and Wojciech Świtała. With the latter, Krzeszowiec recorded his first CD, containing the three Piano & Violin Sonatas by Johannes Brahms. It was published in 2001 by the Sony Classical label. This album was nominated to the « Fryderyk » award as the best chamber music recording.

In 2011, he recorded another violin & piano CD, with a leading Swedish pianist, Niklas Sivelöv. This album, named « Fratres », contains pieces inspired by baroque music, written by 20th century composers. It has been published by the DUX label.

Silesian String Quartet 

Since 2001, Szymon Krzeszowiec has been the first violinist of the Silesian String Quartet. Rehearsals, recordings and performances as a member of this ensemble have become his most important activities. As a chamber musician, Krzeszowiec played with such artists as, among others : Max Artved, Detlef Bensman, Bruno Canino, Dmitri Ferschtman, Maciej Grzybowski, Paul Gulda, Krzysztof Jabłoński, Krzysztof Jakowicz, Andrzej Jasiński, Jadwiga Kotnowska, Ralph Kirshbaum, Mats Lidstroem, Waldemar Malicki, Vladimir Mendelssohn, Tomasz Miczka, Bartłomiej Nizioł, Janusz Olejniczak, Bruno Pasquier, Piotr Pławner, Ewa Pobłocka, Dominik Połoński, Niklas Sivelöv, Jan Stanienda, Tomasz Strahl, Piotr Szymyślik, Marek Toporowski. He performed or/and recorded with such ensembles as Dominant, Lutosławski, Royal, Stamic, Vanbrugh and Wieniawski string quartets. 

On the 15 CDs recorded by the Silesian String Quartet with Krzeszowiec as the first violinist, there are mainly pieces by Polish composers of the last 30 years. Chamber music of this period of Polish music is often performed by the Silesian String Quartet, as promoting contemporary music is one of the aims of the ensemble. In 2002, the Silesian String Quartet won the prestigious « Orfeusz » Award, given by the Association of Polish Musicians, for having premiered Witold Szalonek’s Symphony of rituals on the « Warsaw Autumn » Festival.

Aristos Trio 

While studying in such a cultural centre as Amsterdam, Szymon Krzeszowiec met Danish musicians Jakob Kullberg (cello) and Alexander Øllgaard (viola). Since 2004, they have performed as the Trio Aristos. In 2006, this ensemble won prestigious chamber music competitions in Copenhagen (Denmark) and Sondershausen (Germany). In Denmark, the Trio Aristos was contacted by the composer Per Nørgård, who asked the musicians to premiere some of his works.

Teaching 
Since 1998, Szymon Krzeszowiec is a pedagogue of the Karol Szymanowski Academy of Music in Katowice. He teaches at the Karol Szymanowski Secondary Musical School as well. Annually since 2004, he has given chamber music master classes at the International Princess Daisy Chamber Arts Festival Ensemble. Often, Krzeszowiec gives violin master classes and works in juries of musical competitions.

Discography

References 

Polish classical violinists
Male classical violinists
21st-century classical violinists
Living people
1974 births
21st-century male musicians